Grottazzolina is a town and comune in the province of Fermo, in the Marche region of Italy.

Twin towns - twin cities
  Komádi – Hungary
  2nd district of Budapest – Hungary

References

External links
Commune website

Cities and towns in the Marche